Philophobia is the second studio album by Scottish indie rock band Arab Strap. It was released on 20 April 1998 on Chemikal Underground.

Philophobia peaked at number 37 on the UK Albums Chart, as well as number 3 on the UK Independent Albums Chart.

The 2010 reissue edition of the album comes with an additional bonus disc.

Critical reception

NME named Philophobia the 17th best album of 1998. In 2012, Fact placed the album at number 91 on its "100 Best Albums of the 1990s" list.

Track listing

Personnel
Credits for Philophobia adapted from album liner notes.

Arab Strap
 Malcolm Middleton
 Aidan Moffat

Additional musicians
 Alan Barr – cello (1)
 Chris Geddes – Wurlitzer electric piano (1), Hammond organ (2)
 Stuart Murdoch – piano (2)
 Sarah Martin – violin (2)
 Gary Miller – bass guitar (2)
 David Gow – drums (2), organ (5)
 Alan Wylie – trumpet (7)
 Adele Bethel – lyrics (10), vocals (10)
 Cora Bissett – cello (12)

Production
 Geoff Allan – recording (1, 2, 3, 6, 7, 9, 13), engineering (1, 2, 3, 6, 7, 9, 13), production
 Paul Savage – recording (4, 5, 8, 10, 11, 12), engineering (4, 5, 8, 10, 11, 12), production

Artwork and design
 Adam Piggot – graphics
 Marianne Greated – painting

Charts

References

External links
 

1998 albums
Arab Strap (band) albums
Chemikal Underground albums
Matador Records albums